In taxonomy, the Methanopyri are a class of the Euryarchaeota.

References

Further reading

Scientific journals

Scientific books

Scientific databases

External links

Archaea classes
Euryarchaeota